George Reynolds Dale (February 5, 1867, Monticello, Indiana – March 27, 1936, Muncie, Indiana) was an American newspaper editor and politician.  He was best known as the editor of the Muncie Post-Democrat from 1920 to 1936, and as mayor of Muncie from 1930 to 1935.  His life's works include the starting of several newspapers and battling bootleggers and the Ku Klux Klan.

In 1932, Dale was convicted of violating Prohibition laws.  His conviction was upheld on appeal, but he was pardoned after the repeal of Prohibition in 1933 by President Franklin D. Roosevelt.

Personal life

Dale was born of pioneer and military heritage in Monticello, Indiana. His father, William D. Dale was a Union captain, in Company K of the 19th Indiana Regiment, during the U.S. Civil War, and his grandfather William Dale settled in Monticello after migrating from Virginia. His mother was Ophelia Reynolds, also of the Monticello area. Both parents were deceased before his eighteenth birthday, his father in 1886 and mother in 1887. Growing up in rural Indiana, he attended local public schools.

He married his wife, Lena Mohler, in Hartford City on January 14, 1900. They had seven children: Mary O., Elizabeth, George R. "Bud" Jr., Martha Ellen, Virginia Ruth, Daniel D. and John Dale.

Publishing career
Hartford City Press
 Co-produced the paper with Charles Wigmore
 This was Dale's first hands-on experience in daily news and was the city's first daily paper.
Hartford City Journal
 Started and ran until 1915 when he sold the paper and moved to Muncie
Muncie Post
 Editor until the paper folded in 1921
Muncie Post-Democrat (1921-1950s)
 Created the Post-Democrat after the collapse of the Muncie Post
 It was the only known Democratic paper in Delaware county at the time of its creation, and was circulated weekly
 It was used to combat corrupt officials and the Ku-Klux-Klan
 It was the target of numerous physical and verbal attacks and eventually had to be printed outside of the state of Indiana.

Political career
His political career, like much of his life, although brief, was full of controversy. He publicly continued his attacks on both the current corrupt officials and the Ku Klux Klan. He was inaugurated on January 6, 1930, and served just one term. He is well known for his house-cleaning of the Muncie government in which he removed most of the local government and replaced the entire police and fire departments within days of his inauguration.

Descendants/namesakes
Deceased is George "Bud" R. Dale Jr. of Muncie. Currently there are three surviving namesakes: George "Skip" Reynolds Dale III and George "Chip" Reynolds Dale IV both of Delphi, Indiana, and most recently George "Reyn" Reynolds Dale V was born.

On December 14, 2018, Dale's great-grandson Andrew Dale announced that he was running for mayor of Muncie in 2019 as a Democrat but he was defeated in the primary in May 2019.

See also
List of people pardoned or granted clemency by the president of the United States

References

Roll, Charles (1931). Indiana: One Hundred and Fifty Years of American Development, Lewis Publishing Company.

Digital Media Repository, Ball State University

External links
Frank, Carrolyle M. "Muncie Politics: George R. Dale, Municipal Reformer, 1921-1936". Conspectus of History 1.4 (1977): 34-47.
George R. Dale, Dale Family History
 George R. Dale Collection Digital Media Repository, Ball State University Libraries
 George R. Dale Papers Archives and Special Collections, Ball State University Libraries (PDF)
 "George Dale Dies, Ku Klux Klan Foe", The New York Times, March 28, 1936 (subscription required).
Muncie Post-Democrat at the Digital Media Repository of Ball State University Libraries

1867 births
1936 deaths
Mayors of Muncie, Indiana
American newspaper editors
Recipients of American presidential pardons
People from Monticello, Indiana